Harold Schlosberg (January 3, 1904 – August 5, 1964) was an American psychologist who was professor of psychology at Brown University from 1928 until the end of his life. Born in Brooklyn, N.Y, Schlosberg earned his Bachelor's (1925) and Ph.D. (1928) degrees from Princeton University.  An experimental psychologist, Schlosberg made notable contributions on subjects ranging from conditioned reflexes to the expression of human emotions.  He co-authored the 1954 2nd edition of Experimental Psychology, an influential textbook used by a generation of graduate students.  Schlosberg served as chairman of Brown's Department of Psychology from 1954 until his death in 1964. As Chair, he was responsible for planning the construction of Hunter Laboratory, at the time a state-of-the-art building expressly designed for undergraduate teaching and the requirements of psychological research, from animal behavior to visual perception.

Schlosberg was particularly noted for his work on the conditioned reflex, visual perception  and the analysis of human emotions.   He was among the first to distinguish classical (Pavlovian) conditioning from instrumental (operant) conditioning.  He pioneered the description of emotion in terms of spatial dimensions, with labels such as happy versus sad and disgust versus surprise, a description based primarily on the analysis of facial expressions.

Further biographical information at: .

References

External links
Harold H. Schlosberg links
His Ph.D dissertation A Study of the Conditioned Patellar Reflex

20th-century American psychologists
1904 births
1964 deaths
Brown University faculty
Princeton University alumni